Mohammad Bagher Zolghadr is an Iranian retired military commander in the Islamic Revolutionary Guard Corps who currently serves as the Secretary of the Expediency Discernment Council. Also he is currently member of the Expediency Discernment Council.

He was formerly the deputy for strategic, societal–security and crime prevention affairs in the Judicial system of Iran. He is also a former Deputy Interior Minister for Security Affairs under Mahmoud Ahmadinejad.

Military career
In the early 1980s, Zolghadr co-headed Islamic Revolutionary Guard Corps' educational division. He later served as the commander of IRGC Irregular Warfare Headquarters, as well as Ramazan Headquarters. Zolghadr served as the deputy commander of the IRGC. In 2007, Zolghadr was appointed as the deputy chief of general staff of Iranian Armed Forces for Basij-related affairs.

Political activity
Following the Iranian Revolution, Zolghadr joined the Mojahedin of the Islamic Revolution Organization and belonged to its right-wing faction, having previously been a member of Mansouroun guerrilla organization along with later fellow IRGC servicemen Rezaei, Shamkhani and Rashid. He is reportedly "one of the founders" of Ansar-e Hezbollah.

Judicial career
Zolghadr was appointed as the deputy Judiciary chief for strategic affairs on 14 May 2012, having previously served as the advisor to the Chief Justice Sadeq Larijani since 2010.

References

Living people
Iranian Vice Ministers
Islamic Revolutionary Guard Corps brigadier generals
Popular Front of Islamic Revolution Forces politicians
Mojahedin of the Islamic Revolution Organization politicians
Ansar-e Hezbollah politicians
Islamic Revolutionary Guard Corps personnel of the Iran–Iraq War
Year of birth missing (living people)
Iranian campaign managers